Batyrbek Kazbekovich Tsakulov (born October 20, 1998) is a Russian-Slovak freestyle wrestler of Ossetian descent. He is a 2019 U23 World Championship finalist, 2020 Ivan Yarygin champion (finalist in 2019), 2019 U23 European Champion (bronze medalist in 2018) and 2018 Russian National Champion (bronze medalist in 2019).

Major results

References

External links 
 

Living people
1998 births
Russian male sport wrestlers
Slovak male sport wrestlers
World Wrestling Championships medalists
21st-century Russian people
21st-century Slovak people